Jim Mackonochie (died 21 April 2013) was a British Royal Navy officer who became a leading figure in the development of combat flight simulation video games.

He founded the game publisher Mirrorsoft in 1982. At The Fighter Collection and Eagle Dynamics, he was instrumental in the development of Falcon (1984 and later), Su-27 Flanker (1995), Lock On: Modern Air Combat (2003), Digital Combat Simulator (2008) and other games.

References

2013 deaths
Royal Navy officers
Video game developers
Year of birth missing